Fabavirus is a genus of plant viruses (plant pathogens) in the order Picornavirales, in the family Secoviridae, in the subfamily Comovirinae. Plants serve as natural hosts. There are seven species in this genus.

Taxonomy
The genus contains the following species:
Broad bean wilt virus 1
Broad bean wilt virus 2
Cucurbit mild mosaic virus
Gentian mosaic virus
Grapevine fabavirus
Lamium mild mosaic virus
Prunus virus F

Structure
Viruses in Fabavirus are non-enveloped, with icosahedral geometries, and T=pseudo3 symmetry. The diameter is around 28-30 nm. Genomes are linear and segmented, bipartite, around 23.4kb in length.

Life cycle
Viral replication is cytoplasmic. Entry into the host cell is achieved by penetration into the host cell. Replication follows the positive stranded RNA virus replication model. Positive stranded RNA virus transcription is the method of transcription. The virus exits the host cell by tubule-guided viral movement.
Plants serve as the natural host. The virus is transmitted via a vector (aphid). Transmission routes are vector and mechanical.

History 
Proposed in 1987, as the Fabavirus group, it was originally unassigned but given genus status in 1993 as a member of the Comoviridae, of the Picornavirales in 2008, and reached its current taxonomic status in 2009. There are seven species. The genus is named after the broad bean (Vicia faba).

See also

References

External links
 Viralzone: Fabavirus
 ICTV

Fabaviruses
Viral plant pathogens and diseases
Ornamental plant pathogens and diseases
Comovirinae